The Communauté de communes du Pays de la Goële et du Multien (acronym: PGM) is  a former federation of municipalities (communauté de communes) in the Seine-et-Marne département and in the Île-de-France région of France. It was created in June 1973. It was merged into the new Communauté de communes Plaines et Monts de France in January 2013.

Before 2007, it was named "Communauté de communes de Dammartin-en-Goële".

Composition 
The Communauté de communes comprised the following communes:

Cuisy
Dammartin-en-Goële
Longperrier
Marchémoret
Montgé-en-Goële
Moussy-le-Neuf
Oissery
Le Plessis-l'Évêque
Saint-Mard
Saint-Pathus
Thieux
Villeneuve-sous-Dammartin

See also
Communes of the Seine-et-Marne department

References

Former commune communities of Seine-et-Marne